Aliyar (also spelt Aaliyar / Azhiyar) is a village located near Pollachi Town in Coimbatore district in Tamil Nadu, India. 

Aliyar Reservoir is located in this village. Temple of Consciousness, Vethathiri Maharishi Yoga and KayaKalpa Research Foundation is situated in Aliyar village.  Indian Postal Code is 642 101.

Location
Aliyar is located on Pollachi-Valparai Highway SH-78, next to Aliyar Reservoir and TNSTC State Transportation buses are available to Arutperunjothi Nagar (Aliyar) from Pollachi.

Economy

World Community Service Centre (WCSC)
In 1958 Vethathiri Maharishi founded the World Community Service Centre (WCSC), a non-profit registered society with a view to work towards World Peace through individual peace. As of 2020, more than 200 trusts and about 2000 meditation centres have been registered and affiliated to WCSC in India.

Temple of Consciousness
In 1984, Vethathiri Maharishi Kundalini Yoga and Kaya Kalpa Research Foundation were founded at Aliyar near Pollachi, Tamil Nadu. On behalf of this foundation, a Temple of Consciousness was constructed in Aliyar, where Thathvagnani Vethathiri resides and  preaches. As a unit of this Trust, a spiritual educational wing is also functioning in the name of "Vethathiri Maharishi Institute of Spiritual and Intuitional Education (VISION)". 

At the Temple of Consciousness, facilities are provided for large groups to stay and undergo simplified Kundalini yoga) courses of several days in duration. The Temple of Consciousness is the centerpiece of the campus.

In 1998 the Brain Trust was established as a wing of the World Community Service Centre, a common platform for intellectuals to work for solutions to fundamental problems facing humanity and for bringing about peace and harmony to the individual and to the world at large.

See also
 N. Mahalingam

External links
World Community Service Center WCSC
Welcome to Vethathiri Maharishi

Villages in Coimbatore district